The 7th Golden Horse Awards (Mandarin:第7屆金馬獎) took place on October 30, 1969 at Zhongshan Hall in Taipei, Taiwan.

Winners and nominees 
Winners are listed first, highlighted in boldface.

References

7th
1969 film awards
1969 in Taiwan